Michael David Young (born February 21, 1962) is a former professional Football Player.  He was a wide receiver in the National Football League (NFL) for ten seasons, playing for the Los Angeles Rams, the Denver Broncos, the Philadelphia Eagles, and the Kansas City Chiefs.  Michael Young’s career in professional sports has spanned over 33 years as he is one of the very few NFL players to occupy senior level executive positions for multiple professional sports franchises.

College
The Visalia, CA native was a multi-sport athlete at Mt. Whitney High School where he excelled in football and baseball. Michael’s career statistics of 162 catches for 3,005 yards and 44 touchdowns still stand as one of the top performances in CIF history. Young was recruited by every major college football program in the Country, accepting recruiting visits to Notre Dame, USC, Nebraska, Oklahoma, Washington and UCLA.  At UCLA, he played both football and baseball.  Young helped the Bruins to two Pac-10 titles, two Rose Bowl (1983, 1984) victories and a Fiesta Bowl (1985) win.  Michael was an Academic All-Pac 10 selection in 1984 and in the 1984 Rose Bowl game, Young had 5 receptions for a total of 127 yards, including a 52-yard touchdown pass from Rick Neuheisel.  As a two-sport athlete, Young was drafted by the New York Mets in 1983 after hitting .311 his sophomore year.   Following the 1985 Fiesta Bowl win, in which he was the leading receiver, he was drafted by the Los Angeles Rams.  He earned a bachelor's degree in sociology from UCLA.

NFL
Young was drafted by the Los Angeles Rams in the 6th round (161st overall) of the 1985 NFL Draft. In 10 years in the NFL, he played in 114 games amassing 144 receptions, 2,034 yards and 14 touchdowns.

Young played in Super Bowl XXIV in 1989, where his Denver Broncos lost to the San Francisco 49ers. In that playoff run, he had 4 receptions for 145 yards and a touchdown, which remains the Broncos franchise record of yards per reception for a single postseason with 36.25.

Post NFL career
Young successfully made the transition to the Broncos’ front office after a 10-year career as a wide receiver in the National Football League.  In 13 years in the front office of the Denver Broncos, he was responsible for the development and management of corporate partnerships, marketing, and branding. Initially hired by Broncos owner Pat Bowlen to develop and implement a corporate partnerships program, Young was instrumental in creating the platform and eventual sale of the Stadium Naming rights of INVESCO Field at Mile High Stadium. During his tenure, Young oversaw several major rebranding efforts including a collaborative effort with Phil Knight of Nike to redesign the Broncos team’s Logos and uniforms which propelled the Broncos from 20th to one of the top 3 teams in NFL merchandise sales. Young was also responsible for the creation and design of the Broncos’ first and only mascot Miles.

In 2003, while serving as the Broncos’ Senior Director of Special Projects, Young, along with the backing of Pat Bowlen, John Elway and Denver sports mogul Stan Kroenke, launched the Colorado Crush of the Arena Football League. In his role as Executive Vice President, Young designed and implemented the Crush's entire business strategy. In the first two years of its existence, the Crush sold out every game to lead the Arena Football League in attendance and in its third year of existence won the Arena Football League Championship.

On May 22, 2009, Young was appointed as Chief Revenue Officer for the Los Angeles Dodgers.  As the first and only Chief Revenue Officer of the Los Angeles Dodgers, Michael oversaw all major revenue streams which included Ticket Sales, Corporate Sales, Premium Seating and all Media
Partnerships. Throughout Young’s career, he has been personally responsible for the development of corporate partnership transactions which have generated over $350,000,000. Young has created and lead departments that have transacted with virtually every major corporation connected to sports and
entertainment resulting in over a Billion dollars in total revenues.

References

External links
NFL stats
Colorado Crush bio page
Pro Football Reference

1962 births
Living people
People from Hanford, California
American football wide receivers
UCLA Bruins football players
UCLA Bruins baseball players
Los Angeles Rams players
Denver Broncos players
Philadelphia Eagles players
Kansas City Chiefs players
Players of American football from California
Los Angeles Dodgers executives